Sally Pilbeam (1978) is an arm amputee Australian paratriathlete. In 2014, she won a gold medal at the 2014 World Triathlon Series Final in Edmonton, Alberta, Canada.

Pilbeam was born in 1978 and lives in Perth, Western Australia. She is married and has two sons. In 2002, she lost her right arm at the shoulder due to cancer. She rides a modified bike in the cycling leg of paratriathlon events. In 2014, she is classified as a PT3 paratriathlete.

Pilbeam, first competed at the Australian Paratriathlon Championships in 2013. At the 2013 ITU World Triathlon Series Final in London, England, she finished eighth in the Women’s TRI-4. In 2014,  she won Oceania Paratriathlon Championships, ITU World Paratriathlon Event in Melbourne, Australia and ITU World Paratriathlon Event in Yokohama, Japan in Women’s PT3 events. In August 2014, she won her first world championship by winning the Women's PT3 at the 2014 ITU World Triathlon Series Final in Edmonton, Alberta, Canada.

In January 2015, Pilbeam won the Oceania Paratriathlon Championships PT3 event at Penrith, New South Wales. At the 2015 World Championships Final in Chicago, she won the gold medal in the Women's PT3.

She won silver medals at the 2016, 2017 and 2018  ITU World Championships Series Finals. At the 2019 ITU World Triathlon Grand Final in Lausanne, she finished fifth in the Women's PTS5.

Her coach is Andrew Budge.

References 

1978 births
Living people
Sportswomen from Western Australia
Paratriathletes of Australia
Australian female triathletes